This is a list of newspapers currently published in Norfolk Island.

Weekly
The Norfolk Islander – since 1965
Norfolk Online News – online only

See also
 List of newspapers

References

Norfolk Island
Communications in Norfolk Island
Newspapers